New Hope is a town in Collin County, Texas, United States. The population was 614 at the 2010 census.

New Hope is a class B town and has an aldermanic form of government, under State of Texas general law. The mayor and five aldermen meet once a month on the last Tuesday of the month for town council meetings.

Geography

Demographics

As of the census of 2000,  662 people, 230 households, and 201 families resided in the town. The population density was 460.7 people per square mile (177.5/km2). The 243 housing units averaged 169.1 per square mile (65.2/km2). The racial makeup of the town was 95.17% White, 0.15% African American, 0.76% Native American, 3.02% from other races, and 0.91% from two or more races. Hispanics or Latinos of any race were 5.74% of the population.

Of the 230 households, 34.3% had children under the age of 18 living with them, 79.6% were married couples living together, 5.7% had a female householder with no husband present, and 12.6% were not families. About 11.3% of all households were made up of individuals, and 6.1% had someone living alone who was 65 years of age or older. The average household size was 2.88 and the average family size was 3.09.

In the town, the population was distributed as 25.4% under the age of 18, 7.3% from 18 to 24, 27.2% from 25 to 44, 29.3% from 45 to 64, and 10.9% who were 65 years of age or older. The median age was 41 years. For every 100 females, there were 107.5 males. For every 100 females age 18 and over, there were 103.3 males.

The median income for a household in the town was $66,563, and the median income for a family was $67,083. Males had a median income of $42,188 versus $30,795 for females. The per capita income for the town was $24,542. About 1.4% of families and 2.7% of the population were below the poverty line, including 1.7% of those under age 18 and 1.4% of those age 65 or over.

References

Dallas–Fort Worth metroplex
Towns in Collin County, Texas
Towns in Texas